Świerczyna is a village in the administrative district of Gmina Osieczna, within Leszno County, Greater Poland Voivodeship, in west-central Poland.

The village has a population of 860.

References

Villages in Leszno County